Barbosella miersii is a species of orchid endemic to Brazil. It is known from the States of São Paulo, Paraná and Rio Grande do Sul

References

External links
 
 
 Encyclopedia of Life, Barbosella miersii 
 IOSPE orchid photos Barbosella miersii

miersii
Orchids of Brazil
Plants described in 1842